Caravan of Death is a 1920 silent German film directed by Josef Stein and featuring Carl de Vogt as Kara Ben Nemsi.  The film was an adaptation of the latter half of the Karl May novel From Baghdad to Stamboul, and is now considered to be lost. 

It was a sequel to Stein's earlier 1920 film On the Brink of Paradise. Béla Lugosi played a supporting role as a sheik. Erwin Baron, who wrote the screenplay, also played Omram in the film.

Plot
Kara Ben Nemsi and his servant Haji Halef Omar join a group of Mohammedans on a pilgrimage to bury their dead. When a plague erupts, the two men become infected. Weakened by the disease, they must protect the caravan from traps set by the group's Kurdish enemies on their way to the holy site.

Cast
 Carl de Vogt as Kara Ben Nemsi
 Meinhart Maur as Hadschi Halef Omar / Saduk
 Erwin Baron as Omram
 Gustav Kirchberg as Hassan Ardschir Mirza
 Dora Gerson as Dschana Ardschir Mirza
 Cläre Lotto as Benda Ardschir Mirza
 Maximilian Werrak as Tschaschefsky
 Karl Kuszar Puffy as Kepek
 Erna Felsneck as Amina
 Anna von Palen as Marah Durimeh
 Beate Herwigh as Hafsa
 Béla Lugosi as Scheik
 Arthur Kraußneck as Tschaschefsky

See also
 Karl May films
 Béla Lugosi filmography

References

External links

1920 films
1920 adventure films
1920 lost films
German adventure films
Films of the Weimar Republic
Films based on the Orient Cycle
Films set in the 19th century
German silent feature films
German black-and-white films
Lost German films
Lost adventure films
Silent adventure films
1920s German films